Peter, also Peter II of Courtenay (died 1219), was emperor of the Latin Empire of Constantinople from 1216 to 1217.

Biography
Peter II was a son of Peter I of Courtenay (died 1183), a younger son of Louis VI of France and his second wife, Adélaide de Maurienne. His mother was Elisabeth de Courtenay, daughter of Renaud de Courtenay (died 1194) and Hawise du Donjon.

Peter first married Agnes I, via whom he obtained the three counties of Nevers, Auxerre, and Tonnerre. In 1193 he married secondly to Yolanda, a sister of Baldwin and Henry of Flanders, who were afterwards the first and second emperors of the Latin Empire of Constantinople. Peter accompanied his cousin, King Philip Augustus, on the third Crusade in 1190, returning to France in 1193. He fought (alongside his brother Robert) in the Albigensian Crusade in 1209 and 1211, when he took part in the siege of Lavaur. He was present at the Battle of Bouvines in 1214.

When his brother-in-law, the emperor Henry, died without issue in 1216, Peter was chosen as his successor, and with a small army he left his residence of château de Druyes in France to take possession of his throne. He was consecrated emperor at the Basilica of Saint Lawrence outside the Walls in Rome by Pope Honorius III on 9 April 1217. He then borrowed some ships from the Venetians, promising in return to conquer Durazzo for them, but he failed in this enterprise, and sought to make his way to Constantinople by land. On the journey he was seized by the despot of Epirus, Theodore Komnenos Doukas, and, after an imprisonment of two years, died, probably by foul means. Peter thus never governed his empire, which, however, was ruled for a time by his wife, Yolanda, who had succeeded in reaching Constantinople. Two of his sons, Robert and Baldwin, reigned in turn as emperors of the Latin Empire of Constantinople.

Family
By his first wife Agnes I, Countess of Nevers he had:
 Matilda I, Countess of Nevers

By his second wife Yolanda of Flanders, of the House of Flanders  he had:
 Philip (died 1226), Marquis of Namur, who declined the offer of the crown of the Latin Empire
 Robert of Courtenay (died 1228), Latin Emperor of the Latin Empire of Constantinople 
 Henry (died 1229), Marquis of Namur
 Baldwin II of Constantinople (died 1273), Latin Emperor of the Latin Empire of Constantinople 
 Margaret (died 1270), Marchioness of Namur, who first married Raoul, Lord of Issoudun, and then Henry I, Count of Vianden
 Elizabeth of Courtenay who married Walter count of Bar and then Eudes sire of Montagu
 Yolanda de Courtenay, who married Andrew II of Hungary, King of Hungary and King of Croatia
 Eleanor, who married Philip of Montfort, Lord of Tyre
 Marie de Courtenay, who married Theodore I Lascaris, Emperor of Nicaea
 Agnes, who married Geoffrey II Villehardouin, Prince of Achaea

He had an illegitimate son:
 Geoffrey, marquis of Lavaur (died 1229).

References

Sources
 

 
 

1219 deaths
13th-century Latin Emperors of Constantinople
Christians of the Third Crusade
People of the Albigensian Crusade
Capetian House of Courtenay
Year of birth unknown
13th-century rulers in Europe
Prisoners and detainees of the Despotate of Epirus
People who died in prison custody